Luna E-1 No.1, sometimes identified by NASA as Luna 1958A, was a Soviet Luna E-1 spacecraft which was intended to impact the Moon. It did not accomplish this objective as it was lost in a launch failure. It was the first of four E-1 missions to be launched.

Luna E-1 No.1 was a  spacecraft which marked the first Soviet attempt to send a spacecraft to the Moon. It was also the first mission of the Luna programme. The spacecraft was intended to release  of sodium, in order to create a "comet" of the metal which could be observed from Earth, allowing the spacecraft to be tracked. Prior to the release of information about its mission, NASA correctly identified that it had been an attempted lunar impact mission.

Chief Designer Sergei Korolev's ambitious space plans were being continually frustrated by design changes to the R-7 missile, launch failures, and the fact that the ICBM program took priority. On 10 July 1958, a test version of the Luna booster was flown which had a dummy upper stage (live avionics, but no engine) in order to try out the modifications to the R-7, which included a stronger airframe to support the added weight of the upper stage and more powerful engines (these engines had first been tested on Sputnik 3's booster a few months earlier). At liftoff, the Blok D strap-on suffered an engine malfunction and broke off of the booster, impacting on the pad and exploding. The rest of the R-7 crashed a few hundred feet away. This accident, which caused considerable damage to Site 1/5, was traced to high-frequency vibrations in the combustion chamber of Blok D, something that would become a persistent problem on R-7 launches over the next two years. Since the first Luna probe was scheduled for launch in a month, repairs on the pad were done at breakneck speed.

As Korolev knew that the United States was planning to launch a lunar probe on 17 August 1958, he faced considerable pressure getting the Luna and its booster ready for launch. Despite a number of technical issues, the pad crews managed to get the booster ready on the 17 August 1958, but Korolev instead decided to let the US flight go first on the reasoning that the Luna probe had a shorter trajectory to travel and would reach the Moon first. After that launch ended in a booster explosion, he decided to postpone the flight until the glitches with the 8K72 and Luna could be worked out.

Luna E-1 No.1 was launched on 23 September 1958 at 07:40:23 GMT atop a Luna 8K72 carrier rocket, flying from Site 1/5 at the Baikonur Cosmodrome. Ninety-two seconds after launch, longitudinal resonance within the rocket's strap-on booster rockets caused the vehicle to disintegrate.

References

Luna programme
Spacecraft launched in 1958